Marie-Louise Tardif is a Canadian politician, who was elected to the National Assembly of Quebec in the 2018 provincial election. She represents the electoral district of Laviolette–Saint-Maurice as a member of the Coalition Avenir Québec. On March 7, 2023, Tardif temporarily withdrawn from the CAQ's caucus amid allegations Tardif threatened her former constituency manager in court.

References

Living people
Coalition Avenir Québec MNAs
21st-century Canadian politicians
Women MNAs in Quebec
People from Mauricie
Year of birth missing (living people)
21st-century Canadian women politicians